The women's regu sepak takraw competition at the 2002 Asian Games in Busan was held from 7 October to 9 October at the Minseok Sports Center in Dongseo University.

Squads

Results 
All times are Korea Standard Time (UTC+09:00)

Preliminary round

Group A

|-
|7 October||10:00
|align=right|
|align=center|0–2
|align=left|
|11–21||8–21||
|-
|7 October||14:30
|align=right|
|align=center|0–2
|align=left|
|19–21||19–21||
|-
|8 October||10:00
|align=right|
|align=center|2–0
|align=left|
|21–16||21–18||

Group B

|-
|7 October||10:00
|align=right|
|align=center|2–0
|align=left|
|21–13||21–17||
|-
|7 October||14:30
|align=right|
|align=center|2–1
|align=left|
|13–21||21–12||15–8
|-
|8 October||10:00
|align=right|
|align=center|2–0
|align=left|
|21–13||21–18||

Knockout round

Semifinals

|-
|8 October||14:00
|align=right|
|align=center|2–0
|align=left|
|21–13||21–7||
|-
|8 October||15:30
|align=right|
|align=center|0–2
|align=left|
|11–21||14–21||

Final

|-
|9 October||14:00
|align=right|
|align=center|2–0
|align=left|
|21–9||22–20||

References 

Official Website
2002 Asian Games Official Report, Page 591

Sepak takraw at the 2002 Asian Games